The 2014 President's Cup was a professional tennis tournament played on outdoor hard courts. It was the ninth edition of the tournament for men (second of the year on account of the 2014 Astana Challenger) and the sixth edition for women, part of the 2014 ATP Challenger Tour and the 2014 ITF Women's Circuit respectively. Offering prize money of $125,000 for the men and $100,000 for the women, the events took place in Astana, Kazakhstan, on 21–27 July 2014.

Men's singles main draw entrants

Seeds 

 1 Rankings as of 14 July 2014

Other entrants 
The following players received wildcards into the singles main draw:
  Karen Khachanov
   Dmitry Popko
  Andrey Rublev
  Denis Yevseyev

The following players received entry from the qualifying draw:
  Mikhail Biryukov
  Temur Ismailov
  Jaime Pulgar García
  Yaraslav Shyla

The following player entered using a protected ranking:
  Sergei Bubka

Women's singles main draw entrants

Seeds 

 1 Rankings as of 14 July 2014

Other entrants 
The following players received wildcards into the singles main draw:
  Anastasia Bukhanko
  Anna Danilina
  Alexandra Grinchishina
  Ekaterina Klyueva

The following players received entry from the qualifying draw:
  Olga Ianchuk
  Veronika Kudermetova
  Sviatlana Pirazhenka
  İpek Soylu

The following players entered using a protected ranking:
  Akgul Amanmuradova
  Evgeniya Rodina
  Ana Savić

Champions

Men's singles 

  Ričardas Berankis def.  Marsel İlhan 7–5, 5–7, 6–3

Women's singles 

  Vitalia Diatchenko def.  Çağla Büyükakçay 6–4, 3–6, 6–2

Men's doubles 

  Sergei Bubka /  Marco Chiudinelli def.  Chen Ti /  Huang Liang-chi 6–3, 6–4

Women's doubles 

  Vitalia Diatchenko /  Margarita Gasparyan def.  Michaela Boev /  Anna-Lena Friedsam 6–4, 6–1

External links 
  
 2014 President's Cup at ITFtennis.com

2014
2014 ATP Challenger Tour
2014 ITF Women's Circuit
Hard court tennis tournaments
Tennis tournaments in Kazakhstan